The Banbury lock is an early form of church lock, in which the metal components of the lock are separately fitted into a block of wood which forms the frame.

References 

Locks (security device)